Benny Lam (born 9 April 1959) is a former Israeli footballer who works as the manager of Maccabi Petah Tikva.

Honours

National
Israeli Premier League (3):
1977-78, 1979-80, 1982-83
Israeli Supercup (2):
1980, 1983
League Cup (2):
1982-83, 1983–84

International
UEFA Intertoto Cup (2):
1980, 1983

Managerial stats
As of 17 March 2023

References

External links

1959 births
Living people
Israeli footballers
Israeli beach soccer players
Maccabi Netanya F.C. players
Hapoel Ashdod F.C. players
Maccabi Sha'arayim F.C. players
Hapoel Tayibe F.C. players
Liga Leumit players
Israeli football managers
Maccabi Netanya F.C. managers
Maccabi Petah Tikva F.C. managers
Israeli Premier League managers
Footballers from Netanya
Israeli people of German-Jewish descent
Association football midfielders
Israel international footballers